The Crane Wives is a four-piece indie band founded in Grand Rapids, Michigan, United States in 2010.  They refer to themselves as a "home grown indie-folk outfit from Grand Rapids, Michigan that defies musical stereotypes." They utilize three-part vocal harmonies and eclectic instrumentation.

Career

Early history
Emilee Petersmark (guitar/vocals) and Kate Pillsbury (guitar/vocals) were aspiring solo artists who were working in a Chinese restaurant in Grandville, Michigan. In an attempt to avoid waiting tables, they began performing weekends in the restaurant under the name The Crane Wives but were not well received.

The addition of Dan Rickabus (percussion/vocals), Ben Zito (bass), and Tom Gunnels (banjo) in late 2010 expanded upon the duo, but the name remained the same.

Formation and Safe Ship, Harbored (2010–2011)
Petersmark and Pillsbury, both students at Allendale's Grand Valley State University,  joined fellow students Gunnels and Rickabus for the practice sessions in August 2010.  The band played a few shows around Grand Rapids, and soon after, friend and fellow GVSU student Ben Zito (who ran sound for the band a few times) joined as the band's bass player, completing the sound.

The upbeat sound, folk influence, and use of three-part harmony set the band apart in the indie rock-dominated Grand Rapids music scene.  While the band's name came in part from The Decemberists' 2006 album, The Crane Wife, the members claim a wide variety of influences: folk, blues, ska, punk, and even heavy metal.

The Crane Wives released their first full-length CD, Safe Ship Harbored, in May 2011.  The album was self-produced, backed primarily through donation of studio time from Sound Post Studios, where Rickabus worked as a sound engineer, and also a generous response to the band's Kickstarter campaign.

In June 2011, the band received a degree of national attention when Colin Meloy, lead singer of the Decemberists, saw their album at NPR during an interview and had his picture taken with it.  In response to the photo, fans and other local artists mimicked Meloy's pose (profile, with Safe Ship, Harbored touching their noses) and posted their photos to Facebook, creating a flood of support for the band.  (A month prior, they had tried to book an opening performance for The Decemberists at Calvin College, but were unable to secure the spot.)

The band  received attention and recognition in 2012, garnering several local awards.  Paste Magazine listed them among their "12 Michigan Acts You Should Listen to Now".  They were also recipients of the "Local Spin of the Year" from Grand Rapids Press.  They also took three awards at WYCE's "Jammies", a local award ceremony for prominent West Michigan musicians.  Awards received were Album of the Year (Safe Ship, Harbored), Song of the Year (Safe Ship, Harbored), and the Listener's Choice Award.

The Fool in Her Wedding Gown and Touring (2012–2014)
In 2012, The Crane Wives played music festivals, and toured Michigan and surrounding states in 2013.  Their second album, The Fool in Her Wedding Gown, was released September 22, 2012 at The Intersection, a nightclub in Grand Rapids.

The band was in talks with several managers and booking agents but did not sign any deals.

Coyote Stories and Foxlore (2015–Present)
On August 29, 2015, the band released their album Coyote Stories at Founders Brewing Company in Grand Rapids, MI. Coyote Stories was recorded as part of a two album project, in which The Crane Wives recorded two albums worth of material in March and April 2015. The second album, Foxlore was released April 2, 2016. The albums feature a progression from the previous two albums with the addition of electric guitar and other various instrumentation. The two albums also feature long-time collaborators in the Michigan music community, including: Seth Bernard, Steve Leaf (Steve Leaf and the Ex Pats, Public Access), Savanna Buist (The Accidentals), Katie Larson (The Accidentals), Justin Dore (Big Dudee Roo), Rachel Gorman (The Red Sea Pedestrians)

In a Facebook post by Dan on February 3, 2015 news came of Tom's departure.

Hello friends, fans, this is Dan writing to you. I come bearing sad news. After over 4 years in The Crane Wives, our friend and banjo-player Tom Gunnels will no longer be with the band.

In an article on LocalSpins, it was said that The Crane Wives continue as a four-piece set.

Band members
 Emilee Petersmark (guitar/vocals) 
 Kate Pillsbury (guitar/vocals) 
 Dan Rickabus (drums/vocals) 
 Ben Zito (bass)

Brand endorsements
 Godin Guitars (Emilee Petersmark)
 GHS Strings

Discography

Studio
 Safe Ship, Harbored (2011)
 The Fool in Her Wedding Gown (2012)
 Coyote Stories (2015)
 Foxlore (2016)

Live
 Live from River City Studios (3 Song EP, download only)
 Here I Am: Live from the Listening Room (2020)
 dogtownstudio recordings (2023)

Awards

References

External links 
 Official Website
 MySpace
 Live Collection
 Facebook
 Reverbnation

Indie pop groups from Michigan
Musical groups established in 2010
Musical quintets
American indie folk groups
2010 establishments in Michigan